Geomydoecus is a genus of louse in the suborder Ischnocera. They are parasites of gophers (Geomyidae). Species include:

 Subgenus Geomydoecus 
G. fulvescens 
G. heaneyi 
G. geomydis 
G. idahoensis 
G. oregonus 
G. pattoni 
G. veracruzensis 

 Subgenus Thaelerius 
G. jamesbeeri

References

Lice
Parasitic arthropods of mammals
Parasites of rodents